Ivar Formo (24 June 1951 – 26 December 2006) was a Norwegian cross-country skier and orienteer who competed during the 1970s.

Career
He won four medals at the Winter Olympics. Formo also won two bronze medals at the FIS Nordic World Ski Championships in the 4 × 10 km relay (1974, 1978). Formo also competed in orienteering, winning a bronze medal in the relay at the 1974 world championships, where he also placed ninth in the individual contest.

He represented the club SFK Lyn. He won a number of awards for his accomplishments within sports, notably the Holmenkollen medal in 1975 (shared with Gerhard Grimmer and his good friend and rival Oddvar Brå) and Egebergs Ærespris in 1973.

In 1979 he was part of the Lyn Jukola orienteering relay winning team.

After retiring as an athlete he had a successful career as a businessman, and served as chairman of the cross-country committee (1983–1988) in the International Ski Federation. Formo earned an engineering degree, and was chairman of the board of Ignis at the time of his death.

Formo was found drowned in the lake Store Sandungen in Nordmarka, the forests surrounding Oslo. He had gone jogging and skating through the area and had most likely fallen through the ice. He was survived by his two sons, and his partner during fifteen years, former orienteering competitor Wenche Jacobsen.

Cross-country skiing results
All results are sourced from the International Ski Federation (FIS).

Olympic Games
 4 medals – (1 gold, 2 silver, 1 bronze)

World Championships
 2 medals – (2 bronze)

References

External links
 databaseOlympics.com profile on Formo – Accessed December 27, 2006.
 Formo's death announced – Accessed December 27, 2006 .
 Formo's death announced – Accessed December 27, 2006 .
 Formo's training schedule in preparation for the 50 km at the 1976 Winter Olympics in Innsbruck – Accessed December 27, 2006.
 
 Holmenkollen medalists – click Holmenkollmedaljen for downloadable pdf file 

1951 births
2006 deaths
Cross-country skiers at the 1972 Winter Olympics
Cross-country skiers at the 1976 Winter Olympics
Medalists at the 1976 Winter Olympics
Medalists at the 1972 Winter Olympics
Olympic cross-country skiers of Norway
Olympic gold medalists for Norway
Olympic medalists in cross-country skiing
Olympic silver medalists for Norway
20th-century Norwegian engineers
Norwegian male cross-country skiers
Norwegian orienteers
Male orienteers
Foot orienteers
World Orienteering Championships medalists
FIS Nordic World Ski Championships medalists in cross-country skiing
Holmenkollen medalists
Deaths by drowning in Norway
Accidental deaths in Norway
Olympic bronze medalists for Norway